Empress Guo (975–1007) was a Chinese empress consort of the Song Dynasty, married to Emperor Zhenzong of Song.

She became the primary consort of Zhezong in 991, in a marriage arranged by his father the emperor. The marriage produced no children. She became his empress consort when he succeeded to the throne in 997.

Titles
During the reign of Emperor Taizu of Song (4 February 960– 14 November 976):
Lady Guo (郭氏; from 975)
During the reign of Emperor Taizong of Song (15 November 976 – 8 May 997)
Lady of Lu State (鲁国夫人; from 991)
Lady of Qin State (秦国夫人; from 996)
During the reign of Emperor Zhenzong of Song (8 May 997 – 23 March 1022 )
Empress (皇后; from May 997)
Empress Zhangmu (穆皇后; from 1007)

Issue
As Lady of Lu State: 
Zhao You, Crown Prince Daoxian (悼獻皇太子 趙佑; 995–1003), second son of Emperor Zhenzong
As Empress:
Unnamed son
Unnamed son

Notes

1007 deaths
Song dynasty empresses
975 births
10th-century Chinese women
10th-century Chinese people
11th-century Chinese women
11th-century Chinese people
People from Shaanxi